Sadra may refer to:
Sadra, Fars, a city in Shiraz County, Fars Province, Iran
Mulla Sadra, Iranian philosopher
SADRA, Iran Marine Industrial Company
Shahrak-e Sadra, Neyriz
Sadra (island), an island in Persian Gulf
Sadra (music)
Sadra, Gandhinagar, village in Gujarat state, India